Cycling (Spanish: Ciclismo), for the 2013 Bolivarian Games, took place from 17 November to 26 November 2013.

Within this sport, there are four different cycling disclipines: BMX racing (Spanish: Ciclismo BMX), Mountain biking (Spanish: Ciclismo de Montaña), Road racing (Spanish: Ciclismo de Ruta), and Track cycling (Spanish: Ciclismo Pista).

Medal summary

BMX

Mountain biking

Road cycling

Track cycling

Medal table

References

Events at the 2013 Bolivarian Games
2013 in cycle racing
2013 Bolivarian Games
2013 in track cycling
2013 in road cycling
2013 in mountain biking
2013 in BMX